Chontal (from , 'foreigner') may refer to various ethnic groups in the Mesoamerican world.

Pre-Conquest Maya region
 Chontal or Putún Maya, a collective name for several groups of Maya during the Late Classic and Postclassic Eras

Mexico

Guerrero
 Chontal of Guerrero (es), an extinct indigenous people in northern Guerrero

Tabasco
 Chontal Maya people, an indigenous people of Tabasco
 Chontal Maya language, spoken by the Chontal Maya people

Oaxaca
 Chontal of Oaxaca, another name for the Tequistlatecan languages
 Lowland Oaxaca Chontal, another name for the Huamelula language
 Highland Oaxaca Chontal, a language spoken by some indigenous people in the state

Nicaragua
 Chontales Department, one of fifteen departments in Nicaragua
 Chontal of Nicaragua (es), the ethnicity for which the department is named after